The following are the ranks of officials and officers of the Philippine National Police (PNP). These men and women report to the president of the Philippines as the commander-in-chief, through the secretary of the interior and local government, who is ex officio the chair of the National Police Commission, and the undersecretary for public safety under the Department of the Interior and Local Government.

Current ranking classification (2019–present) 
As of February 2019, a new ranking classification for the Philippine National Police was adopted, eliminating the confusion of old ranks.
 The enabling law for the ranking is Republic Act 11200 which was signed by President Rodrigo Duterte, amending Section 28 of the Department of the Interior and Local Government Act of 1990 that refers to the ranking classification of the Philippine National Police.

However, the usage of this classification internally by the PNP was put on hold in March 2019 during the creation of rules and regulations (IRR) of the rank classification, which determined how each rank would be officially abbreviated. The new rank abbreviations and the IRR of the new rank system officially took effect on March 25, 2019. These new ranks are equivalent to those of the Armed Forces of the Philippines.

Full set of ranks 
The National Police has no rank holders of Second Lieutenant, Technical Sergeant, Sergeant and Patrolman First Class.

Historical classifications

1991–2019 PNP classification 
The Department of the Interior and Local Government Act of 1990 or Republic Act No. 6975 established the Philippine National Police under the Department of the Interior and Local Government, and later orders of the Department formed the basis for the creation of a common rank system for the public security forces of the republic, which the National Police used for over two decades.

Ranks of the Philippine Constabulary 

Philippine Constabulary, which lasted between 1901 to 1991, was a gendarmerie police force which initially had its ranks and insignia er modelled after the United States Army upon its foundation before switching to Philippine Army styling with branch-specific shoulder board and sleeve insignia.

Officers

Enlisted constables and NCOs 
Master Sergeant
Technical Sergeant
Staff Sergeant
Sergeant
Constable 1st Class
Constable 2nd Class
Constable

Integrated National Police 
The defunct Integrated National Police adopted a paramilitary-styled ranking classification based on Presidential Decree No. 1184 (the Integrated National Police Personnel Professionalization Law of 1977) issued by then-President Ferdinand Marcos as part of the joint command it shared with the PC, which began in 1975.

Informal ranks
Prior to the adoption of the 2019 classification, the police has informally used military ranks to address to each other; such as tiniente or lieutenant for officers who had recently graduated from the Philippine National Police Academy while Chief Superintendents up to the Director General were  colloquially referred to as Generals.

See also
Police rank
Chief of the Philippine National Police, top position in the Philippine National Police, sometimes referred to as the Director General after the prerequisite rank of the position.

References

External links
 Republic Act No. 6975 (1990) from the LawPhil Project

Philippines
Law enforcement in the Philippines
Ranks